This article lists temporary speakers and deputy speakers who lead the meeting of the People's Representative Council of the term before the definitive speaker and deputy speaker for the term is elected.

According to the tradition, since 1971, the position of temporary speakers is held by the youngest and oldest member of the council. Prior to 1971, the position is held by the oldest member only.

This tradition was halted for some time from 2004 until 2014, when a new law states that "the temporary speakers should be chosen from the party who obtained the largest and the second largest of the vote".

Bibliography

References 

Lists of political office-holders in Indonesia